

Kyrgyzstan Futsal League 2011 standings
Champion of Kyrgyzstan Futsal League 2011 is Nalogovik Bishkek.

Best player: Zakir Kasimov (Spartak Batken) and Vadim Kryakovskiy (Khimik Kara-Balta)

Best goalkeeper: Erkin Rasulov (Nalogovik Bishkek)

Best scorer: Rustam İsayev (Nalogovik Bishkek)

Kyrgyzstan Bishkek Premiere League  2010/2011

League standings

References
Futsal Kyrgyzstan
 Nalogovik champion
amfkr.kg
Kyrgyz Futsal

Kyrgyzstan Futsal League
K
Futsal